Charles Joseph Owen (23 April 1887 – 13 June 1956) was an Australian rules footballer who played with Fitzroy in the Victorian Football League (VFL).

Notes

External links 

1887 births
1956 deaths
Australian rules footballers from Victoria (Australia)
Fitzroy Football Club players